Laplace Island may refer to:

Laplace Island (Antarctica) 
Laplace Island (Western Australia)